Pangaimotu is an island in the Vava'u Group of Tonga. It is reachable by a 5-minute boat trip from Neiafu, the capital of Vava'u. The population is 696.

References

Islands of Tonga
Populated places in Vavaʻu